Périgueux  (or  ) is a commune in the Dordogne department, in the administrative region of Nouvelle-Aquitaine, southwestern France.

Périgueux is the prefecture of Dordogne, and the capital city of Périgord. It is also the seat of a Roman Catholic diocese.

History

The name Périgueux comes from Petrocorii, a Latinization of Celtic words meaning "the four tribes" – the Gallic people that held the area before the Roman conquest. Périgueux was their capital city. In 200 BC, the Petrocorii came from the north and settled at Périgueux and established an encampment at La Boissière. After the Roman invasion, they left this post and established themselves on the plain of L'Isle, and the town of Vesunna was created. This Roman city was eventually embellished with amenities such as temples, baths, amphitheatres, and a forum. At the end of the third century AD, the Roman city was surrounded by ramparts, and the town took the name of Civitas Petrocoriorum.

In the 10th century, Le Puy-Saint-Front was constructed around an abbey next to the old Gallo-Roman city. It was organised into a municipality around 1182.

During the year 1940, many Jews from Alsace and Alsatians were evacuated to Périgueux.

Simone Mareuil (a lead actress from the surrealist film Un Chien Andalou) committed self-immolation on 24 October 1954 by dousing herself in gasoline and burning herself to death in a public square in Périgueux.

Geography
The Isle flows through Périgueux.

Population
In 2018, 30,060 people lived in the town, while its metropolitan area had a population of 113,384.

Sights
Sights include: the remains of a Roman amphitheatre (known locally as the arènes romaines) the centre of which has been turned into a green park with a water fountain; the remains of a temple of the Gallic goddess "Vesunna"; and a luxurious Roman villa, called the "Domus of Vesunna", built around a garden courtyard surrounded by a colonnaded peristyle now housed in the Vesunna Gallo-Roman Museum.

Cathedral

The cathedral of St Front was built after 1120 and restored in the 19th century.

The history of the church of St Front of Périgueux has given rise to numerous discussions between archaeologists. Félix de Verneihl claims that St Front's was a copy of St Mark's Basilica in Venice; Quicherat, that it was copied from the church of the Holy Apostles of Constantinople. M. Brutails is of the opinion that even if the style of St Front's reveals an imitation of Oriental art, the construction differs altogether from Byzantine methods. The dates 984–1047, often given for the erection of St Front's, he considers too early; he thinks that the present church of St Front was built about 1120–1173, in imitation of a foreign monument by a native local school of architecture which erected the other domed buildings in the south-west of France.

The local architect, Paul Abadie (1812–1884), was responsible for radical changes to St Front's which are no longer appreciated by architects or local residents who prefer the purer Romanesque church of Saint-Étienne de la Cité, the former Cathedral of Périgueux.

The cathedral is part of the World Heritage Sites of the Routes of Santiago de Compostela in France.

Transport
Périgueux railway station offers connections to Limoges, Bordeaux, Brive-la-Gaillarde, and other regional destinations. The trains are operated by train company SNCF.

Climate 
Périgueux has an oceanic climate (Köppen Cfb) with warm to hot summers combined with cool to mild winters. Périgueux has a mild climate for its latitude and inland position due to the significant Gulf Stream influence on the Bay of Biscay to its west. The resulting maritime air warms winters up, while at the same time it is far enough inland to cause warm summers on average.

Personalities 
Périgueux was the birthplace of:

 Pierre Daumesnil (1776–1832), general of the First Empire.
 Georges Bégué (1911–1993), engineer and agent in the Special Operations Executive
Francine Benoît (1894–1990), composer, music critic and teacher, who gained Portuguese citizenship in 1929. She taught pianist Maria João Pires and composer Emanuel Nunes, amongst others.
 William Joseph Chaminade (1761–1850), founder of the Society of Mary (Marianists) and the Daughters of Mary Immaculate
Patrick Ollier (1944–), politician, President of the National Assembly in 2007.
Jean Clédat (1871–1943), Egyptologist, archaeologist and philologist.
Ketty Kerviel (1916–2009), film actress
Nicole Duclos born Salavert (1947–), athlete.
Rachilde (1860–1953), writer associated with the Decadent and Symbolist movements.
Julien Dupuy (1983–), rugby union player.
Greg Mathias (1967–), artist and sculptor, member of the Neo Cubist school of art.
René Thomas (1886–1975), racing driver, winner of the Indianapolis 500 in 1914.

International relations

Périgueux is twinned with:
 Amberg, Germany

See also

Communes of the Dordogne department
Périgord

Notes

References

External links

 City council of Périgueux
 reports on culture and people in Périgueux
 Web site of the Périgord
 Perigueux-city.com

Communes of Dordogne
Dordogne communes articles needing translation from French Wikipedia
Prefectures in France
Périgord